Vrabac (sparrow) may refer to:

 Vrabac (surname)
 Šoštarić Vrabac, Yugoslav primary glider
 Vrabac Mini UAV, Serbian reconnaissance aircraft

See also